Flames United SC is  a Sint Maarten football club that currently plays in the SMSA Senior League, the highest level of football on Dutch Sint Maarten. The club's home ground is the Raoul Illidge Sports Complex in Philipsburg, the country's capital. The club also fields a futsal team. The current manager is Omar Hunter and the current team captain is Loxley Parker.

History
Flames United Sports Club was founded in January 2010. The team won its first league championship in 2015. The club also finished the Excellence Division, a competition between the top teams from the islands of Sint Maarten, Saint Martin and St. Barths, as champions in 2013 and runners-up in 2012.

In January 2016 it was announced that the Flames United squad would play as the Sint Maarten national football team during 2017 Caribbean Cup qualification after winning the league championship for the recently concluded season. However, shortly thereafter it was reported that the previous report was inaccurate and that Flames United would actually be competing in CFU Club Championship for the first time.

The club participated in the 2017 CFU Club Championship. They were drawn into Group E with all matches being played at Victoria Park in Kingstown, Saint Vincent and the Grenadines. They were eliminated from contention following two defeats in which they conceded nine goals per match. Yonel Martin and Rosshawn Haird scored the club's first-ever goals in the competition in the team's 2–9 defeat to System 3 FC of Saint Vincent and the Grenadines.

Current squad

2021-22

Achievements
SMSA Senior League champions (2): 2014/15, 2020/21
Excellence Division champions (1): 2013
Excellence Division runners-Up (1): 2012

CFU Club Championship
Results list Flames United SC's goal tally first.

References

External links
Official Facebook

Football clubs in Sint Maarten
Association football clubs established in 2010
2010 establishments in Sint Maarten